The Lovelock Shield, officially known as the Southern Football Championships, was an annual competition held between representative teams from the four leagues in the Southern Zone of South Australian Country Football.  The Lovelock Shield was established in 1953 between the Hills Football Association, Hills Central Football Association, Southern Football Association and the Great Southern Football League. The shield was presented by the inaugural president of the Southern Football Championships, Mr. C. K. (Pete) Lovelock.

In 1958, the Southern Football Association left and was replaced by the River Murray Football League.  Southern re-joined in 1962 when the Hills Football Association folded.  In 1967, the Hills Central Football Association merged with the Torrens Valley Football League to form the Hills Football League and a representative team from this newly formed league replaced Hills Central in the competition.

Other than in the years 1970 and 1971, the Lovelock Shield ran continuously until 1999.  It has not been held since.

Association Records

Lovelock Shield Results

References

1953 establishments in Australia
1999 disestablishments in Australia
Defunct Australian rules football competitions in South Australia